Somaqcheh (also Romanized as Somāqcheh; also known as Sāqcheh) is a village in Karizan Rural District, Nasrabad District, Torbat-e Jam County, Razavi Khorasan Province, Iran. At the 2006 census, its population was 100, in 26 families.

References 

Populated places in Torbat-e Jam County